Jesus Camacho or Jesús Camacho (born 6 March 1998 in Mexico City) is a Mexican professional squash player. As of February 2018, he was ranked number 72 in the world.

References

1998 births
Living people
Mexican male squash players